The Prisoners of Time is the eleventh book in the Lone Wolf book series created by Joe Dever.

Gameplay

Lone Wolf books rely on a combination of thought and luck. Certain statistics such as combat skill and endurance attributes are determined randomly before play (reading). The player is then allowed to choose which Magnakai disciplines or skills he or she possess. This number depends directly on how many books in the series have been completed ("Magnakai rank"). With each additional book completed, the player chooses one additional Magnakai discipline.

Like several of the previous books in the series, this book again suffers from relative linearity.  Furthermore, there are a set of difficult battles near the end of the book which can make completing the book frustrating, particularly for those who are not carrying characters over from previous books (and thus do not have the advantage of additional Magnakai disciplines or ranks).

Plot

Although Lone Wolf is successful in rescuing one of the captive Lorestones from Torgar, both he and the remaining two Lorestones are blasted through a dimensional portal (Shadow Gate) by Darklord Gnaag. After plummeting through the Shadow Gate, Lone Wolf finds himself trapped on the Daziarn Plane and must join strange allies and face old enemies if he hopes to make his way back from the Daziarn in time to save his homeland from destruction at the hands of the Darklords and their powerful new armies.

External links
Gamebooks - Lone Wolf
Gamebooks - The Prisoners of Time
Project Aon - The Prisoners of Time

1987 fiction books
Lone Wolf (gamebooks)
Berkley Books books